Vita Rashid Mfaume Kawawa (born 20 January 1964) is a Tanzanian CCM politician and Member of Parliament for Namtumbo constituency since 2005. As of March 1, 2016, Kawawa was serving as the district commissioner of the Kahama district.

References

1964 births
Living people
Chama Cha Mapinduzi MPs
Tanzanian MPs 2005–2010
Tanzanian MPs 2010–2015
Aga Khan Mzizima Secondary School alumni
College of Business Education alumni